Storenvy is an e-commerce platform. It is an online store builder combined with a social marketplace. Storenvy launched in 2012, and the sale of products, including apparel, jewelry, art, and home décor, is over $50 million dollars. At present there are 90,000 merchants available that list a variety of products at Storenvy .

Services

Custom stores
Storenvy first launched as an online store builder in 2010. The platform allows store owners, makers, and artists to open an online store for free and customize it.

Storenvy marketplace
When merchants open a store on Storenvy, their products are also featured on the Storenvy marketplace, combining the aspects of a store builder and a marketplace.

Pricing
Storenvy generates revenue through both subscription revenue and on commission fees from sales. This revenue directly funnels the marketing services the company provides to drive additional traffic to store owners.

History
In 2010, the store builder that would become known as Storenvy was launched. In early 2011, the company raised a seed round of $1.53 million.
In late 2012, the Storenvy Marketplace launched with over 35,000 brands. Shortly thereafter, the company raised a Series A round, bringing total funding to over $6.5 million.

In Spring 2016, Storenvy was purchased by The Opensky Project . Storenvy was later sold with other business assets to MoreCommerce Inc, an Alibaba Group subsidiary.

References

External links

American companies established in 2010
Online marketplaces of the United States
2010 establishments in California